The 1904–05 season was the 34th season of competitive football in England.

Overview

Events
Stockport County were replaced by Doncaster Rovers in the Second Division.

At the end of the 1904–05 season, the First Division was expanded to include 20 teams; Bury and Notts County were elected back into the First Division from the Second Division.

Manchester City, the previous season's FA Cup winners, were discovered to have been paying their players up to £6 or £7 per week instead of the legal maximum of £4 per week. The club's influential winger Billy Meredith was accused of bribing Aston Villa player Alex Leake and was faced with an 18-month ban from The Football Association, who further rebuked the club by dismissing five of its directors and banning a total of 17 players from ever playing for the club again.

Honours

Notes = Number in parentheses is the times that club has won that honour. * indicates new record for competition

League tables

First Division

Second Division

References